Robert Gerald "Hank" Utley (March 22, 1924 – March 19, 2014) was a baseball author and historian.

Personal life
Utley was born in Concord, North Carolina, and graduated from Concord High School. He served with the U.S. Army Air Corps during World War II as a second lieutenant bombardier. After serving in the military, he attended North Carolina State University, where he played baseball. He died in High Point, North Carolina.

Baseball endeavours
A member of the Society for American Baseball Research, Utley possessed a nationally known collection of Hank Greenberg photographs and memorabilia. In 1999, his book - co-authored with Scott Verner - The Independent Carolina Baseball League, 1936-1938 was published by McFarland Press. In 2006, he co-authored Outlaw Ballplayers with Tim Peeler and Aaron Peeler. It, too, was published by McFarland Press.

Other endeavours
His efforts as executive director of what was initially called the Boys Club made it possible for girls to join the institution. He served in that capacity from the mid-1970s to the mid-1980s.

References

External links
In Memoriam: Robert G. "Hank" Utley
Guide to the R. G. (Hank) Utley Pi Kappa Alpha Papers 1899-1956

1924 births
2014 deaths
American male writers
United States Army Air Forces personnel of World War II
North Carolina State University alumni